Pakistan participated in the 5th South Asian Games held in Colombo, Sri Lanka in 1991. These games saw women athletes participate for the first time in athletics, table tennis and tennis. Men participated in all the 10 sports: athletics, basketball, boxing, football, shooting, swimming, table tennis, tennis, volleyball, and weightlifting. Its medal tally of 85 placed it third amongst the seven nations. Weightlifting was its most successful event, where it won 30 medals (11 gold, 16 silver, 3 bronze).

Athletes 
 Athletics:
 Basketball:
 Boxing: 
 Football:
 Shooting:
 Swimming:
 Table Tennis:
 Tennis:
 Volleyball:
 Weightlifting:

References

1991 in Pakistani sport
Pakistan at the South Asian Games
1991 South Asian Games